3 Hao Hangzhanlou (Terminal 3) station is a station on the Capital Airport Express of the Beijing Subway, serving Terminal 3 at Beijing Capital International Airport.

Station Layout 
The station has an elevated island and side platform.

Gallery

References

Beijing Subway stations in Shunyi District
Airport railway stations in China
Railway stations in China opened in 2008